Niccolò di Piero Lamberti (ca. 1370 – 1451), also known as Niccolò di Pietro Lamberti, Niccolo Aretino, Niccolò d'Arezzo and as il Pela, was an Italian Renaissance sculptor and architect.  Little is known about his life other than that he was married in Florence in 1392.  His son, Piero di Niccolò Lamberti (1393–1435), was also a sculptor, and the two are notable for exporting the Tuscan style of sculpture to Venice, where they were active in the late 1410s and 1420s.

By 1391 he was working on the Porta della Mandorla of the Florence Cathedral. In 1401 he was one of the artists who participated in the contest that was held to design the North doors of the Florence Baptistery, won by Lorenzo Ghiberti. In 1408 he was chosen as one of three sculptors to create one of the seated Evangelists (St. Mark) for Florence Cathedral.  The statue of St. Mark for Florence Cathedral was completed in 1415 (now in the Museo dell'Opera del Duomo).   He was later active in both Venice and Bologna.  In Venice, his significant role in the sculpture of the upper storey of St. Mark's façade is notable.  In Florence, in addition to his statue of St. Luke at Orsanmichele, he created St. James the Major, on the southern façade for the Guild of Furriers and Skinners. Lamberti is also responsible for two series of capitals at Orsanmichele, one on the right side of the arcade of the eastern façade and one on the left side of the arcade of the southern façade.

References

Sources
 For the English translation by Gaston C. De Vere (1912-1915) see the website created by Adrienne De Angelis.

External links
Niccolò di Piero Lamberti in the Web Gallery of Art

Italian sculptors
Italian male sculptors
Architects from Florence
14th-century Italian architects
15th-century Italian architects
1370s births
1451 deaths